Carpi may refer to:

Places 
 Carpi, Emilia-Romagna, a large town in the province of Modena, central Italy
 Carpi (Africa), a city and former diocese of Roman Africa, now a Latin Catholic titular bishopric

People 

 Carpi (people), an ancient people of the Carpathian region
 Carpi (surname), an Italian surname

Other 

 Carpal bones, also known by the Latin term ossa carpi
 Carpi, plural form of carpus, the cluster of bones in the hand between the radius and ulna and the metacarpus
 Carpi FC 1909, an Italian association football club